Visa requirements for Tanzanian citizens are administrative entry restrictions by the authorities of other states placed on citizens of Tanzania. As of 7 January 2020, Tanzanian citizens had visa-free or visa on arrival access to 70 countries and territories, ranking the Tanzanian passport 73rd in terms of travel freedom (tied with Zambian passport) according to the Henley Passport Index.

Visa requirements map

Visa requirements

Dependent, Disputed, or Restricted territories
Unrecognized or partially recognized countries

Dependent and autonomous territories

See also

Visa policy of Tanzania
Tanzanian passport
List of diplomatic missions in Tanzania
Visa requirements for Burundian citizens
Visa requirements for Congo DR citizens
Visa requirements for Kenyan citizens
Visa requirements for Rwandan citizens
Visa requirements for South Sudanese citizens
Visa requirements for Ugandan citizens

References and Notes
References

Notes

Tanzania
Foreign relations of Tanzania